Go to the Top is the debut album by Japanese singer-songwriter Hitomi, released on September 27, 1995, by Avex Trax. The first press edition of the album came with the CD case housed inside a hardback case, similar to a book. The inside of the back of the case contains a mini-photobook. The RIAJ has certified it 2× platinum, recognizing over 500,000+ shipments throughout Japan.  On the Oricon charts, the album's peak position was #3, and it stayed on the charts for eight weeks.

History
Hitomi had previously released two singles without much success. Her debut single, "Let's Play Winter" failed to chart on Japan's Oricon chart, and her follow-up single, "We Are "Lonely Girl"", while charting much better at #61 on the charts, failed to make a big impression with sales.

It was not until the quiet release of her third single "Candy Girl" that suddenly Hitomi found success. "Candy Girl" charted much higher than her previous attempts, becoming her first single to chart in the Oricon top 20. This was most likely because "Candy Girl" had been aggressively marketed and appeared in a famous Japanese Kodak commercial. The single established the then 19-year-old Hitomi Furuya into a household name, showcasing her provocative image.

Following the sudden success of her third single, Hitomi and her label (fledgling at the time) Avex Trax quickly released another single, "Go to the Top" which also charted in the top 20, ensuring Hitomi's success for the time being. Go to the Top, Hitomi's debut studio album of the same name, was released two months later and rose in the charts, peaking at #3.

Track listing

Personnel
Hitomi - lead vocals, lyrics 
Satoshi Miyashita - bass, chorus
Mami Ishizuka - chorus
Akihiko Shimizu - vocal direction
Shuichi Nakano - drums, percussion, chorus
Kazuhiro Matsuo, Ken Kimura - guitar, chorus
Akio Kondo - keyboards
Doug Sax - mastering
Kevin Moloney - mixing
Akihisa Murakami - programming
Cozy Kubo, Tetsuya Komuro - electronic programming

Production
Produced by hitomi, Tetsuya Komuro for Avex Trax
Co-produced by Cozy Kubo
Executive Production by Max Matsuura
Engineered by Eiji Ohta, Katsuhiro Odashima, Masataka Ito, Shinpachiro Kawabe, Yoshinori Mizuide, Yuki Mitome
Recorded by Naoki Nemoto, Shigeru Matsumura, Toshiaki Sabase, Toshihiro Wako

Charts
Oricon Sales Chart (Japan)

References

1995 debut albums
Hitomi albums
Avex Trax albums
Dance-pop albums by Japanese artists
Albums produced by Tetsuya Komuro